Anthony L. Colaizzo (May 31, 1930 – January 12, 2019) was a Democratic member of the Pennsylvania House of Representatives, where he served for ten years from 1989 until 1999. He was the mayor of Canonsburg, Pennsylvania for ten years until 2009 when David Rhome was elected to replace him.

Background
Colaizzo was born in Canonsburg, Pennsylvania. He received his bachelor's degree in businessman administration, in 1956, from Duquesne University. He was involved in the real estate, tax preparation, and insurance businesses.

References

1930 births
2019 deaths
Mayors of places in Pennsylvania
Democratic Party members of the Pennsylvania House of Representatives
People from Canonsburg, Pennsylvania
Duquesne University alumni
Businesspeople from Pennsylvania
20th-century American businesspeople